Veljko Ugrinić (28 December 1885 – 15 July 1958) was a Croatian football manager. He coached ten matches of the Yugoslavia national football team between 1920 and 1924.

References

External links
 

1885 births
1958 deaths
People from Brod-Posavina County
Yugoslav football managers
Yugoslavia national football team managers